

Plot introduction

Daja's Book, the third installment in the Circle of Magic quartet by Tamora Pierce, is a young adult fantasy novel. Daja Kisubo, an outcast to her people after she was the lone survivor of her family ship's wreck, and a smith mage in training, travels with her three friends and their teachers north of Emelan, to a valley plagued with drought and forest fires. While she and her friends are in Golden Ridge Valley, she creates a living metal vine. Polyam, wirok of Tenth Caravan Idaram, bids on the vine.

Plot summary

The story opens with the four child-mages and their teachers at the end of a caravan. Rosethorn, Briar's teacher, stops to examine the tree-litter and while she does this, Daja catches a glimpse of a forest fire miles off. Tris, Briar, and Sandry all turn to look at the fire while Rosethorn asks their local guide when the last time was that they had a forest fire. However, their guide only laughs and says their mage, called Firetamer, takes care of all their fires, just like his father did. The caravan moves on, but Daja still has an uneasy feeling about the huge fire, noting how fire could be her friend and enemy.

The caravan stops in a small town to study magic and assist the Duke of Emelan with the drought. As Daja is working in the smithy, a woman named Polyam, a wirok, a scorned Trader who negotiates with lugsha, tradesmen, stops by to talk to the smith. As she notices the blank cap on Daja's Trader staff which signifies her exile status, the Trader refuses to talk to her.

Moments later, Daja loses control of her magic because of her anger, putting energy into a clump of melted iron. Soon, it turns into a branch and the Trader is stunned. Throughout the book, Daja and the Trader converse in a bargain for the 'living metal'.

All of the student's magic is so strongly combined that Sandry is forced to create a map of their magic, which she can use to separate their twined magic. Their teachers first noticed the mixed magic when Briar and Sandry used lightning by accident.

While Daja is on her way to the privy, she releases a stream of hot water from within the earth, which spills out onto the stones before her. She and Briar investigate, finding that one of the hot springs leads to an area of ice/glaciers. Melting the water would refill the drying lake, saving one of the town's problems. They also discover a vein of copper which could be used to replenish the town's supply and stimulate trade.

While all the teachers and most of the students are at a watch tower, a huge fire erupts, utilizing all the mast that had built up in the years that Yarrun Firetamer had been suppressing all the fires. After the conceited fire tamer dies in an attempt to stop the fire, the rest of the people try to stop it. Daja is caught in the middle, though, and has to first convince the Trader caravan she is riding with to listen to her, and then stop heading for the fire. She saves the caravan by thrusting all of the fire into a vein in the earth which leads to the glacier.

Lastly, Daja creates a living metal leg with the copper which is now a part of her for the wirok, restoring the Polyam's ability to work with horses, her original job.

Daja is a trangshi, a Trader word which literally means "doesn't exist" or "bad luck". In the end, however, she becomes a Trader again because she had gained enough zokin, or honor, by saving the Tenth Caravan Idaram from the huge forest fire.

References

1998 fantasy novels
1998 American novels
Emelanese books